Yolande E. Chan is a Jamaican-Canadian information systems professor. Chan joined the Desautels Faculty of Management at McGill University as Dean and James McGill Professor in August 2021. Her research focuses on innovation, knowledge strategy, digital strategy, and business-IT alignment. Chan has long been a champion for women and under-represented groups in academia. In her role as Dean of the Desautels Faculty of Management, she has made equity, diversity and inclusion a major strategic priority.

Early life and education 

Chan was born in Kingston, Jamaica to parents Phyllis and George Brown. At the age of 18, she left Jamaica to attend the Massachusetts Institute of Technology where she completed her Bachelor of Science in Electrical Engineering and in her final undergraduate year completed her Master of Science in Electrical Engineering and Computer Science. She then went on to attend Oxford University as a Rhodes Scholar, where she obtained her Master of Philosophy in Management Studies. In doing so she became both the first female student and the first black student from MIT to be a Rhodes Scholar. In 1992, she obtained a PhD in Business Administration (MIS) from Ivey Business School, at  Western University.

Career 

Chan has served as Associate Dean of Research, PhD and MSc Programs, and the E. Marie Shantz Chair of Digital Technology at Smith School of Business at Queen's University prior to joining the Desautels Faculty of Management. She has previously served as Associate Vice-Principal (Research) at Queen's University. Before joining academia, she worked with Andersen Consulting (now Accenture).

Her work has been published in academic journals, including MIT Quarterly, Information Systems Research, Journal of Management Information Systems, Journal of Strategic Information Systems, Journal of the Association for Information Systems, Information Systems Journal, Journal of Information Technology and European Journal of Information Systems. In 2022, she was appointed by Innovation, Science and Economic Development Canada (ISED) to the Government of Canada's Advisory Panel on the Federal Research Support System. She is co-Editor-in Chief of Journal of Strategic Information Systems.

References

External links 
 Yolande E. Chan McGill Profile

Academic staff of McGill University
Academic staff of Queen's University at Kingston
Massachusetts Institute of Technology alumni
Year of birth missing (living people)
Living people
Jamaican emigrants to Canada
People from Kingston, Jamaica
Canadian university and college faculty deans
Jamaican expatriates in the United States
University of Western Ontario alumni
Jamaican Rhodes Scholars
Women deans (academic)
Academic journal editors